Delilah Blue is the second full-length studio album from pianist/singer-songwriter Joshua Kadison.  Released on November 1, 1995, it featured a change of tack.  Whereas the previous album had featured shorter songs, this disc presents a jazzier version of Kadison's music, with much longer tracks (with the title track clocking in at almost ten minutes).  He again wrote all the songs himself (with the exception of the first track, which is public domain), but this time featured in the production credits as well.  The single "Take it on Faith" did not perform very well, and EMI, which owned his contract with Capitol, voided his contract shortly thereafter.

Track listing
All songs written by Joshua Kadison, except where noted.
 "Listen to the Lambs" (traditional, arr. Joshua Kadison) - 1:40
 "Gospel According to My Ol' Man" - 5:30
 "Delilah Blue" - 9:45
 "Waiting in Green Velvet" - 4:55
 "Jus' Like Brigitte Bardot" - 7:53
 "Song on Nefertiti's Radio (My Love)" - 4:05
 "Amsterdam" - 4:56
 "Rosie and Pauly" - 4:36
 "Take it on Faith" - 4:07
 "The Pearl" - 7:00

Personnel 
 Joshua Kadison – vocals, acoustic piano, vocal arrangements 
 Mike Finnigan – Hammond B3 organ
 Joe Hardy – acoustic guitar 
 Jack Holder – electric guitar 
 Dean Parks – acoustic guitar, electric guitar
 Leland Sklar – bass
 Michael Baird – drums
 Lenny Castro – percussion 
 Luis Conte – percussion
 David Boruff – saxophone (6)
 David Campbell – string arrangements and conductor (2, 7)
 Paul Buckmaster – string arrangements and conductor (3)
 Suzie Katayama – string contractor (2, 3, 7)
 Alexandra Brown – backing vocals (1, 2, 4, 8)
 Jacquelyn Gouche-Farris – backing vocals (1, 2, 4, 8)
 Alfie Silas – backing vocals (1, 2, 4, 8)
 Myrna Smith – backing vocals (1, 2, 4, 8)
 Carmen Twillie – backing vocals (1, 2, 4, 8)
 Edna Wright – backing vocals (1, 2, 4, 8)
 Bridgette Bryant – vocal arrangements (1, 2, 4, 5, 8), backing vocals (5), 
 Lynn Fiddmont – vocal arrangements (1, 2, 4, 5, 8), backing vocals (5)
 Marva Hicks – vocal arrangements (1, 2, 4, 5, 8), backing vocals (5)
 Christine McEvilly – backing vocals (2, 4)
 A.S.K. M.E.  [April Allen, Sheree Hicks and Kera Trotter] – backing vocals (6), vocal arrangements (6)

Production 
 Joshua Kadison – producer 
 Nick Bode – executive producer, art direction, design, management 
 Brian Koppelman – A&R 
 Kevin Smith – recording 
 Jeff Shannon – recording assistant 
 Brett Swain – recording assistant
 Al Schmitt – string recording (2, 3, 7)
 Charlie Paakkari – string recording assistant (2, 3, 7)
 Joe Hardy – mixing, additional overdubs
 James Senter – mix assistant
 Malcolm Springer – mix assistant
 Brian Lee – mastering 
 Bob Ludwig – mastering 
 Tom Nelson – photography

Studios
 Recorded at O'Henry Sound Studios (Burbank, California) and Capitol Studios (Hollywood, California).
 Overdubbed at Red Zone Studios (Burbank, California) and House of Blues (Memphis, Tennessee).
 Mixed at House of Blues
 Mastered at Gateway Mastering (Portland, Maine).

Charts

References

External links 
Delilah Blue at AllMusic

1995 albums
Capitol Records albums
EMI Records albums
Joshua Kadison albums
Albums recorded at Capitol Studios